Eagleville, California may refer to:
Eagleville, Modoc County, California
Eagleville, Yuba County, California